The 1981–82 season was the 73rd year of football played by Dundee United, and covers the period from 1 July 1981 to 30 June 1982. United finished in third place, securing UEFA Cup football for the following season.

Match results
Dundee United played a total of 60 competitive matches during the 1981–82 season.

Legend

All results are written with Dundee United's score first.
Own goals in italics

Premier Division

Scottish Cup

League Cup

UEFA Cup

League table

References

See also
 1981–82 in Scottish football

Dundee United F.C. seasons
Dundee United